Pen Sovan (15 April 1936 – 29 October 2016) was a Cambodian politician and revolutionary who served as the Prime Minister of the Hanoi-backed People's Republic of Kampuchea from 27 June to 5 December 1981. He also served as General Secretary of the Kampuchean People's Revolutionary Party (KPRP) from 1979 to 1981. He was arrested and removed from office in December 1981 by the Vietnamese for irritating Lê Đức Thọ, the chief adviser to the PRK government. He was imprisoned in Vietnam until January 1992.

Sovan founded the Cambodian National Sustaining Party, which contested in the 1998 election but did not win a seat in parliament. He later joined the Human Rights Party founded in 2007 and served as its vice president. In 2012, he became a member of the newly founded Cambodia National Rescue Party (CNRP) and stood as an MP candidate for Kampong Speu. He was elected and was sworn in on 5 August 2014, serving until his death in October 2016.

Biography
Pen Sovan was born in Chan Teab Village, Samraong Commune, Tram Kak District, Takéo province. He first joined the Khmer Issarak at the age of 13 in 1950 and fought against the French. Two years later, Sovan joined the Indochinese Communist Party where he first met Ta Mok. Sovan supported the Khmer Rouge during the 1970-1973 civil war against the Khmer Republic and he worked along with Chan Sy under Khieu Thirith, in charge of the Voice of the United National Front of Kampuchea. From 1973 to 1979, Sovan lived in exile in Hanoi.

Sovan was a founding leader of Kampuchean United Front for National Salvation (KUFNS or FUNSK) on 25 November 1978. He served as Secretary-General of the Kampuchean People's Revolutionary Party from 5 January 1979 to 1 December 1981, when he was replaced by Heng Samrin following his removal from office by the Vietnamese.

Sovan was arrested on 2 December 1981 for irritating Lê Đức Thọ, chief Vietnamese advisor to the Kampuchean United Front for National Salvation (FUNSK) and the People's Republic of Kampuchea (PRK). He was released from Vietnam's prison on 25 January 1992, after he served over 10 years. Sovan explained his long ordeal in prison: "When I wanted to create our own army of five regiments, the Vietnamese didn't agree and Lê Đức Thọ went to the USSR to complain." Sovan died in Doun Kaev, Takéo Province on 29 October 2016. He was cremated in Phnom Penh on 6 November 2016. On 10 November, Suon Rida was appointed to fill Sovan's vacant seat.

See also
Communist Party of Kampuchea

References

Bibliography

 Luke Young: Cambodian Political History. The Case of Pen Sovann In: Monthly Review 65.1 (November 2013).
 Scalapino, Robert A.; Wanadi, Jusuf; Economic, political, and security issues in Southeast Asia in the 1980s, Institute of East Asian Studies, University of California, 1982, 

|-

|-

|-

1936 births
2016 deaths
20th-century Cambodian politicians
21st-century Cambodian politicians
Human Rights Party (Cambodia) politicians
Cambodian nationalists
Cambodian socialists
Cambodian revolutionaries
Cambodian military personnel
Cambodian People's Party politicians
Cambodian people imprisoned abroad
Cambodian people of Vietnamese descent
Members of the National Assembly (Cambodia)
Kampuchean United Front for National Salvation politicians
Communist Party of Kampuchea politicians
Cambodia National Rescue Party politicians
People from Takéo province
Defence ministers of Cambodia
People's Republic of Kampuchea
Prisoners and detainees of Vietnam
Prime Ministers of Cambodia
Cambodian politicians convicted of crimes